Holloway is a city in Swift County, Minnesota, United States. The population was 92 at the 2010 census.

History
A post office called Holloway has been in operation since 1889. The city was named for an early settler.

Geography

U.S. Route 59 serves as a main route in the community.

Demographics

2010 census
As of the census of 2010, there were 92 people, 50 households, and 29 families living in the city. The racial makeup of the city was 100.0% White.

There were 50 households, of which 12.0% had children under the age of 18 living with them, 48.0% were married couples living together, 10.0% had a female householder with no husband present, and 42.0% were non-families. 40.0% of all households were made up of individuals, and 16% had someone living alone who was 65 years of age or older. The average household size was 1.84 and the average family size was 2.38.

The median age in the city was 53 years. 13% of residents were under the age of 18; 4.5% were between the ages of 18 and 24; 19.5% were from 25 to 44; 40.3% were from 45 to 64; and 22.8% were 65 years of age or older. The gender makeup of the city was 51.1% male and 48.9% female.

2000 census
As of the census of 2000, there were 112 people, 54 households, and 30 families living in the city. The racial makeup of the city was 99.11% White, and 0.89% from two or more races. Hispanic or Latino of any race were 7.14% of the population.

There were 54 households, out of which 27.8% had children under the age of 18 living with them, 40.7% were married couples living together, 11.1% had a female householder with no husband present, and 44.4% were non-families. 40.7% of all households were made up of individuals, and 20.4% had someone living alone who was 65 years of age or older. The average household size was 2.07 and the average family size was 2.83.

In the city, the population was spread out, with 25.0% under the age of 18, 7.1% from 18 to 24, 24.1% from 25 to 44, 19.6% from 45 to 64, and 24.1% who were 65 years of age or older. The median age was 41 years. For every 100 females, there were 96.5 males. For every 100 females age 18 and over, there were 90.9 males.

The median income for a household in the city was $31,250, and the median income for a family was $37,500. Males had a median income of $26,042 versus $21,250 for females. The per capita income for the city was $14,882. There were 6.3% of families and 9.2% of the population living below the poverty line, including no under eighteens and 10.7% of those over 64.

References

Cities in Minnesota
Cities in Swift County, Minnesota